Sorority Forever is a streaming television series created and produced by web production company Big Fantastic, the creators of SamHas7Friends and Prom Queen. Film director McG is an executive producer of the show. The first season of the series, which debuted September 8, 2008 on TheWB.com, followed four incoming freshmen in "the hottest sorority on campus". While it had some Gossip Girl elements to it, it "also contain(ed) a lot of mystery similar to Prom Queen."

Cast
 Jessica Rose as Julie Gold
 Jessica Morris as Natalie Gold
 Taryn Southern as Taryn Monaghan
 Mikaela Hoover as Madison Westerbrook
 Angie Cole as Naomi King
 Annemarie Pazmino as Rachel
 Candice Patton as Mercedes Muna
 David Loren as Matthew
 Anabella Casanova as Bridget Reynolds
 Joaquin Pastor as Joaquin
 Cary Hungerford as Blake

The show also features original music from up and coming artists The White Tie Affair, J Hall, and Tyroneus.

Awards and nominations

Streamy Awards:
Streamy Award for Best Dramatic Web Series (2009) (nomination)

References

External links 
 Sorority Forever on TheWB.com - official site
 
 Sorority Forever  on Tubefilter News
 Video interview of Big Fantastic founders by Zadi Diaz of EPIC FU, weekly web show that covers online pop culture (September 9, 2008)

2008 web series debuts
2008 web series endings
American drama web series
Television series by Wonderland Sound and Vision